The 1971 Redwood Bank Pacific Coast Open – Doubles was an event of the 1971 Redwood Bank Pacific Coast Open men's tennis tournament and was played on outdoor hard courts at the Berkeley Tennis Club in Berkeley, California in the United States between September 27 and October 3, 1971. The draw comprised 32 teams and two were seeded. Bob Lutz and Stan Smith were the defending doubles champion but did not compete together in this edition. Second-seeded Roy Emerson and Rod Laver won the doubles title by defeating unseeded Ken Rosewall and Fred Stolle in the final, 6–3, 6–3.

Seeds

Draw

Finals

Top half

Bottom half

References

External links
 ITF tournament edition details

Tennis in California